The Heterogastridiales are an order of fungi in the Microbotryomycetes class of the Basidiomycota. The order contains a single family, the Heterogastridiaceae, which in turn contains five genera.  Both the family and the order were circumscribed in 1990.

Some of these fungi have stalked fruiting bodies which are visible to the naked eye, but these are not basidiocarps (where the spores result from sexual reproduction as with ordinary mushrooms); instead they are sporocarps which spread asexual spores.  They can be up to a few millimetres high.  These species are found in separate anamorphic (asexual) and teleomorphic (sexual) forms which need to be associated together in order to correctly classify them and understand their biology.  For instance the teleomorph of the previously known anamorph Hyalopycnis blepharistoma was discovered in 1990 and named Heterogastridium pycnidioideum; analysis of the teleomorph allowed the new order Heterogastridiales to be defined and the position of the species in the tree of life was established (which was not possible from the anamorph alone).  Since then more genera and species have been added to the order.

References

External links
 

Basidiomycota orders
Monotypic fungus taxa
Taxa named by Franz Oberwinkler
Taxa described in 1990